"Ona se budi" ("She Is Waking Up") is the B-side on the only single Mali čovek by Yugoslav new wave band Šarlo Akrobata released in 1981.  It is also the opening track on the Paket aranžman compilation which is one of the most influential releases by Yugoslav rock bands.

In 2006 the song was ranked #5 on the B92 Top 100 Domestic Songs list.

Track listing 
Both tracks written by Šarlo Akrobata

"Mali čovek" 
"Ona se budi"

Personnel 
 Milan Mladenović
 Dušan Kojić Koja
 Ivica Vdović Vd

Cover versions 
 Croatian band Le Cinema, which is a faction of the band Film, recorded a cover version on their first studio album Doručak Kod Trulog.
 Darko Rundek recorded a version of the song for the Milan Mladenović tribute album Kao da je bilo nekad... Posveceno Milanu Mladenoviću.
 Serbian guitarist Miroslav Tadić recorded an instrumental version on his 2013 album Mirina.

References 

 EX YU ROCK enciklopedija 1960-2006,  Janjatović Petar;  

1980 songs